Kohima Town is one of the 60 Legislative Assembly constituencies of Nagaland state in India. It is part of Kohima District and is reserved for candidates belonging to the Scheduled Tribes. It is also part of Nagaland Lok Sabha constituency.

Members of Legislative Assembly
 1964: John Bosco Jasokie, Independent
 1969: John Bosco Jasokie, Nagaland Nationalist Organisation
 1974: John Bosco Jasokie, Nagaland Nationalist Organisation
 1977: John Bosco Jasokie, Indian National Congress
 1982: John Bosco Jasokie, Naga National Democratic Party
 1987: John Bosco Jasokie, Indian National Congress
 1989: K. V. Keditsü, Nagaland People's Council
 1993: Z. Obed, Indian National Congress
 1998: T. Abao Kire, Independent
 2003: Z. Obed, Naga People's Front

Election results

2018

2013

2008

See also
List of constituencies of the Nagaland Legislative Assembly
 Kohima district
 Nagaland (Lok Sabha constituency)

References

Kohima district
Assembly constituencies of Nagaland